Mariano Martínez (born 20 September 1948 in Burgos) is a French former professional road racing cyclist. He won the King of the Mountains competition in 1978 Tour de France. Although he was born in Spain, he became a naturalized French citizen in 1963. He is the father of former racing cyclists Miguel and Yannick Martinez and the grandfather of racing cyclist Lenny Martinez.

Major results

1965
 1st  Road race, National Junior Road Championships
1971
 7th Züri-Metzgete
 8th GP du canton d'Argovie
 9th Overall Étoile des Espoirs
 10th Grand Prix des Nations
1972
 4th Overall Critérium du Dauphiné Libéré
 4th Overall Tour de Romandie
 6th Overall Tour de France
1973
 3rd Overall Grand Prix du Midi Libre
 4th Overall Tour de Romandie
1974
 1st Stage 4 Grand Prix du Midi Libre
 3rd  Road race, UCI Road World Championships
 6th Overall Paris–Nice
 8th Overall Tour de France
 9th Overall Critérium du Dauphiné Libéré
1975
 4th Overall Tour de l'Aude
 5th Overall Tour du Limousin
1976
 10th Rund um den Henninger Turm
1977
 1st Stage 5 Étoile de Bessèges
 10th Overall Setmana Catalana de Ciclisme
1978
 1st Stage 4 Tour du Limousin
 2nd Overall Critérium du Dauphiné Libéré
1st  Mountains classification
 2nd Overall Tour du Vaucluse
1st Stage 1a 
 3rd Overall Circuit de la Sarthe
1st Stage 1 
 4th Overall Tour de Romandie
 5th Grand Prix de Mauléon-Moulins
 6th Overall Tour de Suisse
1st  Points classification
1st  Mountains classification
 7th Overall Critérium National de la Route
 10th Overall Tour de France
 1st  Mountains classification
 1st Stage 11
1979
 3rd Road race, National Road Championships
 6th Overall Grand Prix du Midi Libre
 10th Overall Critérium du Dauphiné Libéré
 10th Grand Prix de Rennes
1980
 1st Stage 17 Tour de France
 1st Stage 3a Tour du Limousin
 9th Rund um den Henninger Turm
1981
 1st Stage 2 Grand Prix du Midi Libre
 2nd Subida a Arrate

References

External links

Official Tour de France results for Mariano Martínez

1948 births
Living people
French male cyclists
Spanish emigrants to France
French Tour de France stage winners
Sportspeople from Burgos
Naturalized citizens of France
Cyclists from Castile and León